Samihah binti Ahmad Baderi (born 22 February 1988), better known by her stage name Mia Ahmad, is a Malaysian actress, commercial/freelance model and a brand ambassador.

Early life
Mia Ahmad was born in Taiping, Perak to a family of Perak heritage with a distant Pattani ancestry. She is the fourth of five siblings. Mia studied in SMK Treacher Methodist Girls' School during her secondary school years and holds a Sijil Pelajaran Malaysia (SPM) qualification.

Career
Mia Ahmad was a former flight stewardess in the local commercial airline, Airasia X and Emirates for approximately 4 years before plunging into the showbiz world. After calling it a quit as a flight attendant, Mia started earning her living doing TV Commercials and modelling. She had been in Oral B and Nestle Nan Grow commercials before she became active into the field of acting until today.

After getting side roles in several TV dramas, she got her first main role in a drama series "Ku Tak Rela" for Slot Azalea (TV3)  followed by getting a place in the TV3, popular drama slot for Akasia, "Hati Perempuan" along with a Malaysian rising star, Saharul Ridzwan.

Mia Ahmad is also currently a brand ambassador of a popular Malaysia's scarves specialist, MumuScarves and a new rising face product, Pesona Ayu Skin Care.

Personal life
Mia married to Malaysian footballer, Izham Tarmizi on 13 January 2017.

On 28 September 2018, she gave birth to her son. following birth 2nd son and current pregnant 3rd

Filmography

Television series

Tele film

Film

Music video

Television commercials

Endorsements
 Ashhannas
 MumuScarves 
 Pesona Ayu Skin Care
 OLI Candy 
 Hajarose KL Hair Mist
 tonton
 Audela Adore Collagen
 Mia Ahmad For Maison De Couture

Founder of Absolue by Mia Ahmad
Tassel by Mia Ahmad (Hijab)
Sweetness by Mia Ahmad (Perfume)
Kohl Lashes by Mia Ahmad (Mascara)

Awards and nominations

References

External links

1988 births
People from Perak
Malaysian people of Malay descent
Malaysian people of Thai descent
Living people
Malaysian Muslims
21st-century Malaysian actresses